Dalnerechensky (masculine), Dalnerechenskaya (feminine), or Dalnerechenskoye (neuter) may refer to:
Dalnerechensky District, a district of Primorsky Krai, Russia
Dalnerechensky Urban Okrug, the municipal formation which the town of Dalnerechensk, Primorsky Krai, Russia, is incorporated as